A stent is a tube or truss used in medicine to keep an anatomical passageway open.

Stent may also refer to:

 Stent (surname), a surname (including a list of people with the name)
 Mount Stent, a mountain in Antarctica
 Star Trek: Enterprise, a TV series

See also
 Stint (disambiguation)